The South African Music Awards (often simply the SAMAs) are the Recording Industry of South Africa's music industry awards, established in 1995. The ceremony is held annually, usually in late April or May, with the judging process starting in November of the previous year. The nominations are typically announced at the end of March. The winners receive a gold-plated statuette called a SAMA.

The show has mostly been held at the Super Bowl in Sun City, with the exception of three years, and broadcast live on national broadcaster, SABC. The ceremony features live performances as once-off collaborations by a selection of nominees.

Awards

As of the 26th SAMAs, in 2020, there are a total of thirty categories awarded. These categories change from year to year to accommodate changes in music styles and changes in popularity of already existing genres. These genres include adult contemporary, Afrikaans, classical, dance, faith, jazz, Kwaito, Maskandi, pop, rap, reggae, RnB, rock, soul and traditional.

At times genres are grouped together into a single category based on their popularity amongst a certain demographic (e.g. Best Urban Artist nominees are often Hip Hop, African pop and Kwaito artists grouped together since these genres are popular amongst South Africans living in urban areas).

As of the 27th South African Music Awards, artists working in the Gqom and Amapiano genres will be considered in separate categories.

Top five awards
These are the top five award categories of the SAMAs. They were first introduced at the ceremony in 1995, with exception of Album of the Year that was introduced in 2007.

 Album of the Year
 Best Newcomer of the Year
 Best Female Artist of the Year
 Best Male Artist of the Year
 Best Duo or Group of the Year

Audience awards
The winners of the following SAMAs are not chosen by a panel of judges:
 Record of the Year: Determined by a public vote, traditionally by SMS

Mobile download awards

Eligibility and entry
As per the committee guidelines, only citizens and permanent residents of South Africa are eligible for a nomination.

Adjudication process
At the beginning of the adjudication process a Supervisory Committee is set up, it consists of two members from each of five "super genre" categories, which are Global Charts, Urban, Traditional, Technical and Jazz or Classical. This committee oversees the entire SAMA ceremony production process, along with the Steering, General Rules, and Vetting Committees. These committees are composed of unpaid volunteers from record companies and industry stakeholders. The judges are drawn from a wide spectrum to include journalists, critics, musicians, producers, and academics. There are five judges per genre category, based on the judge’s field of expertise. The judge’s anonymity is protected by the Steering committee, who ensure the judge’s do not influence each other. The entire adjudication process takes place between September and February, with the nominees announced in March.

Phase one
The first phase takes place between late-September and December. The Steering Committee first determine the award categories, rules, and judging criteria for the entries. A panel of judges is elected and a call for entries takes place in November. The entries are vetted to comply with the committee rules, and genre guidelines.

Phase two
In this genre category phase, the judges receive a copy of the entries (either an album and DVD) by the end of December. The entries are scored against the criteria set by the Steering Committee. The score cards are submitted online, along with recommendations for the Top Five category nominees. The Top Five categories are nominated from the same pool of entries. An electronic judging system calculates the results, which are then audited by an independent firm at the end of January.

Phase three
This final phase of adjudication evaluates the Top Five categories. One judge from each genre category is selected to be part of the first round of voting. These judges select their top three entries, in their respective genres, taking into account the recommendations from other judges. The independent auditing firm ensures that a finalist in the Top Five has qualified for a nomination in their respective genre. Once the auditors have confirmed the Top Five finalist list, the last round of voting begins. All the judges participate in this round to determine the winners of each Top Five categories.

Ceremonies
The first awards ceremony was in 1995, there have been 27 editions to date.

Notable moments

Arthur Mafokate on-stage defiance (1995)
At the 1st South African Music Awards, kwaito artist Arthur Mafokate performed a simulation of anal sex on a dancer. This was done as an act of defiance to the organisers, as he felt there was a need for a Kwaito Award. The following year the organiser introduced the award category.

Funky national anthem (1997)
It had been three years since the first democratic elections in South Africa and a new national anthem had been introduced at the beginning of the 1997. At the 3rd South African Music Awards, popular kwaito-group Boom Shaka decided to re-create the anthem in a "funky" on-stage performance, that later caused a "public blacklash".

Brenda Fassie demanding her award (2001)
Towards the end of the five-hour-long 7th South African Music Awards, Brenda Fassie accused a prominent journalist of being a homosexual - using the derogatory slang word moffie. She went on to further accuse him of destroying her with the articles he published. At an after-party, she was seen fighting with Mandoza and demanding that he hand over his award as it was "her award".

First virtual reality live broadcast (2016)
The SAMA22 was the first awards show to be broadcast live in its entirety in 360° video, with virtual reality made possible by Unreal Industries.

See also
 List of South African Music Award categories
 Metro FM Music Awards

References

External links
 

 
Awards established in 1995
African music awards
Entertainment events in South Africa